Tell Me Something: The Songs of Mose Allison is a collaboration by Northern Irish singer-songwriter Van Morrison, Georgie Fame, Mose Allison and Ben Sidran, released in 1996. It is Van Morrison's 25th album. It charted at No. 1 on the Top Jazz Albums chart.

Recording history
The entire recording for this album was done in a day and all of the performances were live first or second takes. Featuring the songs of Mose Allison, the performers were Allison himself, Georgie Fame, Ben Sidran, and Van Morrison, a longtime admirer of Allison's work. The horns were arranged by Pee Wee Ellis. Morrison said he had wanted to make the record for a long time. Liner notes are by Ben Sidran.

Ben Sidran had said this on working with Van Morrison in the studio for the album:
Heʼs exactly as he appears to be onstage. He never does anything the same way twice. Everything put down in the studio is done live, so whatever you play will likely end up on the finished record.

Track listing
All songs written by Mose Allison.

"One of These Days" – 3:18
"You Can Count on Me (To Do My Part)" – 3:22
"If You Live" – 3:47
"Was" – 3:28
"Look Here" – 2:09
"City Home" – 3:26
"No Trouble Livin'" – 2:15
"Benediction" – 3:01
"Back on the Corner" – 2:23
"Tell Me Something" – 2:40
"I Don't Want Much" – 2:03
"News Nightclub" – 2:43
"Perfect Moment" – 2:13

Personnel
Van Morrison – vocals, harmonica
Georgie Fame – vocals, Hammond organ
Ben Sidran – vocals, piano
Mose Allison – vocals, piano on "I Don't Want Much" and "Perfect Moment"
Alec Dankworth – bass
Ralph Salmins – drums
Guy Barker – trumpet
Pee Wee Ellis – tenor saxophone
Leo Green – tenor saxophone
Robin Aspland – Wurlitzer piano

Charts
Album – Billboard (North America)

References

References 
Hinton, Brian (1997). Celtic Crossroads: The Art of Van Morrison, Sanctuary, 

Van Morrison albums
Mose Allison albums
1996 albums
Verve Records albums
Albums produced by Van Morrison
Georgie Fame albums